Portugal competed at the 2020 Summer Olympics in Tokyo, from 23 July to 8 August 2021. Originally scheduled to take place from 24 July to 9 August 2020, the Games were postponed because of the COVID-19 pandemic. Portuguese athletes have appeared in every edition of the Summer Olympic Games since the nation's debut in 1912.

These were the most successful Olympic Games for Portugal as its delegation won a total of four medals, surpassing the three medals of Los Angeles 1984 and Athens 2004. For the first time ever, Portugal won at least one medal of each kind and reached the podium in more than two sports in the same Games.

Medalists

Competitors
The following is the list of number of competitors participating in the Games:

Athletics

Portuguese athletes further achieved the entry standards, either by qualifying time or by world ranking, in the following track and field events (up to a maximum of 3 athletes in each event):

Track & road events
Men

Women

Field events
Men

Women

Canoeing

Slalom
Portugal qualified one canoeist for the men's K-1 class by finishing in the top eighteen at the 2019 ICF Canoe Slalom World Championships in La Seu d'Urgell, Spain.

Sprint
Portuguese canoeists qualified three boats in each of the following distances for the Games through the 2019 ICF Canoe Sprint World Championships in Szeged, Hungary.

Qualification Legend: FA = Qualify to final (medal); FB = Qualify to final B (non-medal)

Cycling

Road
Portugal entered two riders to compete in the men's Olympic road race, by virtue of their top 50 national finish (for men) in the UCI World Ranking.

Track
Following the completion of the 2020 UCI Track Cycling World Championships, Portugal entered one rider to compete in the women's omnium based on her final individual UCI Olympic rankings.

Omnium

Mountain biking
Portugal entered one mountain biker to compete in the women's cross-country race by finishing in the top two of the under-23 division at the 2019 UCI Mountain Bike World Championships in Mont-Sainte-Anne, Canada.

Equestrian

Portugal fielded a squad of three equestrian riders into the Olympic team dressage competition by finishing eighth overall and securing the last of three available berths for Group A and B at the European Championships in Rotterdam, Netherlands. MeanwhIle, one jumping rider was added to the Portuguese roster by finishing in the top two, outside the group selection, of the individual FEI Olympic Rankings for Groups B (South Western Europe).

Dressage
The Portuguese dressage team was named on June 11, 2021. Carlos Pinto and Sultao Menezes have been named the travelling reserves.

Qualification Legend: Q = Qualified for the final; q = Qualified for the final as a lucky loser

Jumping

Gymnastics

Artistic
Portugal entered one artistic gymnast into the Olympic competition. Rio 2016 Olympian Ana Filipa Martins booked a spot in the women's individual all-around and apparatus events, by finishing last out of the twenty gymnasts eligible for qualification at the 2019 World Championships in Stuttgart, Germany.

Women

Trampoline
Portugal entered one trampoline gymnast into the Olympic competition. Rio 2016 Olympian Diogo Abreu claimed an Olympic spot in the men's event at the 2021 FIG World Cup in Brescia.

Handball

Summary

Men's tournament

Portugal men's national handball team qualified for the Olympics by securing a top-two finish at the Montpellier leg of the 2020 IHF Olympic Qualification Tournament, marking the country's debut in the sport.

Team roster

Group play

Judo

Portugal qualified eight judoka (two men and six women) for each of the following weight classes at the Games. All of them, with Telma Monteiro (women's lightweight, 57 kg) leading the nation's roster at her fifth straight Olympics, were selected among the top 18 judoka of their respective weight classes based on the IJF World Ranking List of June 28, 2021.

Men

Women

Rowing

Portugal qualified one boat in the men's lightweight double sculls for the Games by winning the silver medal and securing the first of two berths available at the 2021 FISA European Olympic Qualification Regatta in Varese, Italy.

Qualification Legend: FA=Final A (medal); FB=Final B (non-medal); FC=Final C (non-medal); FD=Final D (non-medal); FE=Final E (non-medal); FF=Final F (non-medal); SA/B=Semifinals A/B; SC/D=Semifinals C/D; SE/F=Semifinals E/F; QF=Quarterfinals; R=Repechage

Sailing

Portuguese sailors qualified one boat in each of the following classes through the 2018 Sailing World Championships, the class-associated Worlds, and the continental regattas.

M = Medal race; EL = Eliminated – did not advance into the medal race

Shooting

Portuguese shooters achieved quota places for the following events by virtue of their best finishes at the 2018 ISSF World Championships, the 2019 ISSF World Cup series, European Championships or Games, and European Qualifying Tournament, as long as they obtained a minimum qualifying score (MQS) by May 31, 2020.

Skateboarding

Portugal entered one skateboarder into the Olympic competition. Gustavo Ribeiro booked a spot in the men's street as one of the top 16 skateboarders vying for qualification in the Olympic World Skateboarding Rankings on 30 June 2021.

Surfing

Portugal sent three surfers to compete at the Games. Frederico Morais secured a qualification slot in the men's shortboard event for his nation, as the highest-ranked surfer from Europe at the 2019 ISA World Surfing Games in Miyazaki, Japan. On the women's side, Teresa Bonvalot and Yoland Sequeira completed the nation's surfing lineup by scoring a top-two finish within their heat at the 2021 ISA World Surfing Games in El Salvador.

Swimming 

Portuguese swimmers further achieved qualifying standards in the following events (up to a maximum of 2 swimmers in each event at the Olympic Qualifying Time (OQT), and potentially 1 at the Olympic Selection Time (OST)):

Men

Women

Table tennis
 
Portugal entered five athletes into the table tennis competition at the Games. The men's team secured a berth by advancing to the quarterfinal round of the 2020 World Olympic Qualification Event in Gondomar, permitting a maximum of two starters to compete in the men's singles tournament. On the women's side, Rio 2016 Olympian Fu Yu scored an outright semifinal victory to book one of three Olympic spots available at the 2019 European Games in Minsk, Belarus. Shao Jieni was automatically selected among the top ten table tennis players vying for qualification to join Yu in the same event based on the ITTF Olympic Rankings of June 1, 2021.

Taekwondo

Portugal entered one athlete into the taekwondo competition at the Games. Rio 2016 Olympian and double world medalist Rui Bragança secured a spot in the men's flyweight category (58 kg) with a top two finish at the 2021 European Taekwondo Olympic Qualification Tournament in Sofia, Bulgaria.

Tennis

Portugal entered two tennis players into the Olympic tournament. João Sousa (world no. 109) accepted a spare berth previously allocated by one of the original official entrants, with Pedro (world no. 108) topping the list of tennis players vying for qualification from Europe, to compete in the men's singles based on the ATP World Rankings. Additionally, they opted to play together in the men's doubles.

Triathlon

Portugal entered three triathletes (two men and one woman) to compete at the Olympics. Two-time Olympian João Pedro Silva, Rio 2016 Olympian João José Pereira, and rookie Melanie Santos were selected among the top 26 triathletes vying for qualification in their respective events based on the individual ITU World Rankings of 15 June 2021.

See also
 Portugal at the 2020 Summer Paralympics

References

Nations at the 2020 Summer Olympics
2020
2021 in Portuguese sport